Koprivnik is a settlement on the left bank of the Krka River in the Municipality of Kostanjevica na Krki in eastern Slovenia. The area is part of the traditional region of Lower Carniola. It is now included in the Lower Sava Statistical Region.

Roman graves and remains of a bridge over the Krka have been excavated in the vicinity of the settlement.

References

External links

Koprivnik on Geopedia

Populated places in the Municipality of Kostanjevica na Krki